Nicole Schott (born 12 September 1996) is a German figure skater. She is the 2016 CS Warsaw Cup champion, the 2017 CS Tallinn Trophy bronze medalist, a two-time NRW Trophy champion (2014, 2016), and a seven-time German national champion (2012, 2015, 2018–20, 2022–23). She has finished within the top ten at one World and four European Championships.

Schott represented Germany at the 2018 and 2022 Winter Olympics, placing eighteenth and seventeenth, respectively.

Personal life
Nicole Schott was born in Essen. Her father played ice hockey and her younger sister, Vivienne Schott, has competed in figure skating.

Career
In March 2011, Schott represented Germany at the World Junior Championships in Gangneung, South Korea. Ranked 15th in the short program, she qualified for the free skate and finished 22nd overall. In January 2012, Schott won the German national senior title. She was coached by Gudrun Pladdies.

Schott switched to Michael Huth in Oberstdorf in the summer of 2014. She won her first senior international medal, gold, at the NRW Trophy in November 2014. In December, she won her second German national title, finishing ahead of Nathalie Weinzierl by nine points. She reached the free skate at both of her ISU Championship assignments, placing ninth at the 2015 Europeans in Stockholm, Sweden, and 23rd at the 2015 Worlds in Shanghai, China.

In November 2016, Schott stepped on her first ISU Challenger Series podium, taking gold at the Warsaw Cup ahead of Australia's Kailani Craine.  She finished tenth at the 2017 European Championships in Ostrava, Czech Republic. Schott competed at the 2018 Winter Olympics and finished eighteenth.

Schott withdrew from the 2018 Grand Prix of Helsinki due to the flu and a still-healing knee injury.

Named to her second German Olympic team, Schott finished seventeenth at the 2022 Winter Olympics. Days after the Olympics concluded, Vladimir Putin ordered an invasion of Ukraine, as a result of which the International Skating Union banned all Russian and Belarusian skaters from competing at the 2022 World Championships. This had a major impact on the women's field, dominated by Russians for most of the preceding eight years. Schott unexpectedly placed sixth in the short program with a new personal best. Fourteenth in the free skate, she was tenth overall.

Programs

Competitive highlights 
GP: Grand Prix; CS: Challenger Series; JGP: Junior Grand Prix

References 

 2015 German Ladies Figure Skating Championships
 2009 German Novice Ladies Figure Skating Championships
 2008 German Novice Ladies Figure Skating Championships

External links 

 
 Nicole Schott at The Figure Skating Corner
 Nicole Schott at Tracings.net

1996 births
Living people
German female single skaters
Sportspeople from Essen
Figure skaters at the 2018 Winter Olympics
Olympic figure skaters of Germany
Figure skaters at the 2022 Winter Olympics
21st-century German women